Křivoklát Castle is a castle in Křivoklát in the Central Bohemian Region of the Czech Republic. It is protected as a national cultural monument.

History
Křivoklát was founded in the 12th century, belonging to the kings of Bohemia. During the reign of Otakar II of Bohemia a large, monumental royal castle was built, later rebuilt by King Wenceslaus IV and later enlarged by King Vladislaus II.

The castle was damaged by fire several times. It was turned into a harsh prison and the building slowly deteriorated. During the 19th century, the Fürstenberg family became the owners of the castle and had it reconstructed after a fire in 1826. The Fürstenberg family owned the castle until 1929.

Today the castle serves as a museum, tourist destination and place for theatrical exhibitions. Collections of hunting weapons, Gothic paintings and books are stored there.

Gallery

Notable prisoners
 Burkhard von Berlichingen
 Edward Kelley
 Hieronymus Makowsky

External links

Křivoklát on zamky-hrady.cz 
Křivoklát on the official Prague tourist portal

Royal residences in the Czech Republic
Rakovník District
Museums in the Central Bohemian Region
Historic house museums in the Czech Republic
National Cultural Monuments of the Czech Republic
Castles in the Central Bohemian Region
Fürstenberg family residences